The Dial Press was a publishing house founded in 1923 by Lincoln MacVeagh.

The Dial Press shared a building with The Dial and Scofield Thayer worked with both. The first imprint was issued in 1924.

Authors included Elizabeth Bowen, W. R. Burnett and Glenway Wescott, Frank Yerby, James Baldwin, Roy Campbell, Susan Berman, Herbert Gold, Thomas Berger, Vance Bourjaily, Judith Rossner, and Norman Mailer.

In 1963, Dell Publishing Company acquired 60 percent of the Dial Press stock but the Press remained an independent subsidiary. It was jointly owned by Richard Baron (1923–2021) and Dell Publishing; E. L. Doctorow was editor-in-chief. In 1969 the Dial Press became wholly owned by Dell Publishing Company. In 1976 Doubleday bought Dell Publishing and the children's division of Dial Press (Dial Books for Young Readers) was sold to E. P. Dutton. The children's division of Dial Press published books under the Pied Piper imprint.  Dutton would be bought by New American Library, which in turn became a part of the Penguin Group, a division of Pearson PLC. When the Penguin Group obtained the rights to children's books published by the Dial Press, some were published in paperback under the imprint Puffin Pied Piper (because Puffin has been the longtime paperback imprint for the Penguin Group). Doubleday dissolved Dial Press in 1985. The adult imprint was revived by Carole Baron, the publisher of Dell, at the time part of Bantam/Doubleday/Dell, under the leadership of Susan Kamil. It went on to gain awards and bestsellers. It was bought when BDD was sold to Random House. Penguin and Random House merged in 2013, forming Penguin Random House, with the main division part of Random House and the Young Readers division part of Penguin.

Notable books published by The Dial Press
An American Dream, Norman Mailer
Easy Street, Susan Berman
The Detective, Roderick Thorp
The Ecstasy Business, Richard Condon
The Good Thief, Hannah Tinti 
I've Got Your Number, Sophie Kinsella
Mile High, Richard Condon
Nine Months in the Life of an Old Maid, Judith Rossner
The Report from Iron Mountain 
The Fire Next Time, James Baldwin
Stardance, Spider Robinson and Jeanne Robinson 
The Secret Life of Salvador Dalí, Salvador Dalí
Die Nigger Die!, H. Rap Brown
Ethics: Origin and Development, Peter Kropotkin
Secrets at Sea, Richard Peck, illustrated by Kelly Murphy
The Mouse with the Question Mark Tail, Richard Peck, illustrated by Kelly Murphy
Another Country, James Baldwin
Little Big Man, Thomas Berger
Confessions of a Spent Youth, Vance Bourjaily 
The Giant's House, Elizabeth McCracken
It was gonna be like Paris, Emily Listfield
 The War That Saved My Life, Kimberly Brubaker Bradley
 The Short Novels of Dostoevsky (with introduction by Thomas Mann), Fyodor Dostoevsky, translated by Constance Garnett
 The Mysterious Tale of Gentle Jack and Lord Bumblebee George Sand, illustrated by Gennady Spirin, translated by Gela Jacobson

Book series
 The Bourbon Classics
 The Dial Detective Library
 The Dial Standard Library
 Fireside Library
 The Golden Dragon Library
 Library of Living Classics
 Permanent Library
 The Rogue's Library

See also 
Atha Tehon, Art Director of Dial Books for Young Readers

Notes

External links 

Dial Press Records. Yale Collection of American Literature, Beinecke Rare Book and Manuscript Library.
Dial Press finding aid for chronological key events

Book publishing companies based in New York (state)
Publishing companies established in 1923
Random House
Dial Press books